Helen Hayes MacArthur (October 10, 1900 – March 17, 1993) was an American actress whose career spanned nearly 90 years. She eventually received the nickname "First Lady of American Theatre" and was the second person and first woman to have won an Emmy, a Grammy, an Oscar, and a Tony Award (an EGOT). She was also the first person to win the Triple Crown of Acting; to date, the only other people to have accomplished both are Rita Moreno and Viola Davis. Hayes also received the Presidential Medal of Freedom, America's highest civilian honor, from President Ronald Reagan in 1986. In 1988, she was awarded the National Medal of Arts.

The annual Helen Hayes Awards, which have recognized excellence in professional theatre in greater Washington, D.C., since 1984, are her namesake. In 1955, the former Fulton Theatre on 46th Street in New York City's Theatre District was renamed the Helen Hayes Theatre. When that venue was torn down in 1982, the nearby Little Theatre was renamed in her honor. Helen Hayes is regarded as one of the greatest leading ladies of the 20th-century theatre.

Early life 
Helen Hayes Brown was born in Washington, D.C., on October 10, 1900. Her mother, Catherine Estelle "Essie" (née Hayes), was an aspiring actress who worked in touring companies. Her father, Francis van Arnum Brown, worked at a number of jobs, including as a clerk at the Washington Patent Office and as a manager and salesman for a wholesale butcher. Hayes's Catholic maternal grandparents emigrated from Ireland during the Great Famine. Hayes attended Dominican Academy's prestigious primary school, on Manhattan's Upper East Side, from 1910 to 1912, appearing there in The Old Dutch, Little Lord Fauntleroy, and other performances. She attended the Academy of the Sacred Heart Convent in Washington and graduated in 1917.

Career 

Hayes began a stage career at an early age. She said her stage debut was as a five-year-old singer at Washington's Belasco Theatre, on Lafayette Square, across from the White House. By age ten, she had made a short film, Jean and the Calico Doll (1910). 

Her sound film debut was The Sin of Madelon Claudet, for which she won the Academy Award for Best Actress. She followed that with starring roles in Arrowsmith (with Ronald Colman); A Farewell to Arms (with Gary Cooper); The White Sister (opposite Clark Gable); Another Language (opposite Robert Montgomery); What Every Woman Knows (a reprise of her Broadway hit); and Vanessa: Her Love Story also with Robert Montgomery. But Hayes did not prefer film to the stage.

Hayes eventually returned to Broadway in 1935, where for three years she played the title role in Gilbert Miller's production of Victoria Regina, with Vincent Price as Prince Albert, first at the Broadhurst Theatre and later at the Martin Beck Theatre.

In 1951, she was involved in the Broadway revival of J.M. Barrie's play Mary Rose at the ANTA Playhouse. In 1953, she was the first-ever recipient of the Sarah Siddons Award for her work in Chicago theatre, repeating as the winner in 1969. She returned to Hollywood in the 1950s, and her film star began to rise. She starred in My Son John (1952) and Anastasia (1956), and won the Academy Award for Best Supporting Actress for her role as an elderly stowaway in the disaster film Airport (1970). She followed that up with several roles in Disney films such as Herbie Rides Again, One of Our Dinosaurs Is Missing and Candleshoe. Her performance in Anastasia was considered a comeback—she had suspended her career for several years due to her daughter Mary's death and her husband's failing health.

In 1955, the Fulton Theatre was renamed for her. In the 1980s, business interests wished to raze that theatre and four others to construct a large hotel that included the Marquis Theatre. Hayes's consent to raze the theatre named for her was sought and given, though she had no ownership interest in the building. Parts of the original Helen Hayes Theatre on Broadway were used to construct the Shakespeare Center on the Upper West Side of Manhattan, which Hayes dedicated with Joseph Papp in 1982. In 1983 the Little Theater on West 44th Street was renamed the Helen Hayes Theatre in her honor, as was a theatre in Nyack, which has since been renamed the Riverspace-Arts Center. In early 2014, the site was refurbished and styled by interior designer Dawn Hershko and reopened as the Playhouse Market, a quaint restaurant and gourmet deli.

Hayes, who spoke with her good friend Anita Loos almost daily on the phone, told her, "I used to think New York was the most enthralling place in the world. I'll bet it still is and if I were free next summer, I would prove it." With that, she convinced Loos to embark on an exploration of all five boroughs of New York. They visited and explored the city; Bellevue Hospital at night, a tugboat hauling garbage out to sea, parties, libraries, and Puerto Rican markets. They spoke to everyday people to see how they lived their lives and what made the city tick. The result of this collaborative effort was the book Twice Over Lightly, published in 1972.

It is unclear when or by whom Hayes was called the "First Lady of the Theatre". Her friend, actress Katharine Cornell, also held that title, and each thought the other deserved it. One critic said Cornell played every queen as though she were a woman, whereas Hayes played every woman as though she were a queen.

Hayes was also recognized with additional awards during her career. In January 1968, Philadelphia Art Alliance president Raymond S. Green presented her with the alliance's Award of Merit "in recognition of outstanding creative work of high artistic merit." She had been chosen unanimously by the alliance's drama committee and board of directors, according to alliance executive director James Kirk Merrick who noted, "This award isn't given every year.... It is only presented when we feel someone is deserving. I don't think there can be any question as to how we arrived at choosing Miss Hayes."

In 1982, with friend Lady Bird Johnson, she founded the National Wildflower Research Center, now the Lady Bird Johnson Wildflower Center, in Austin, Texas. The center protects and preserves North America's native plants and natural landscapes.

The Helen Hayes Award for theater in the Washington, D.C., area is named in her honor. She has a star on the Hollywood Walk of Fame at 6220 Hollywood Blvd. Hayes is also in the American Theatre Hall of Fame.

Personal life 
Hayes was a Catholic and a pro-business Republican who attended many Republican National Conventions (including the one held in New Orleans in 1988), but she was not as politically vocal as several other Republicans (e.g., Adolphe Menjou, Ginger Rogers, John Wayne, Ronald Reagan, etc.) in the Hollywood community of that time.

Hayes wrote three memoirs: A Gift of Joy, On Reflection, and My Life in Three Acts. Some of these books' themes include her return to Roman Catholicism (she had been denied communion from the Church for the duration of her marriage to Charles MacArthur, who was a divorced Protestant); and the polio-related death of her 19-year-old daughter, Mary (1930–1949), an aspiring actress. Hayes's adopted son, James MacArthur (1937–2010), had a successful career in acting, including as co-star to Jack Lord in Hawaii Five-O. He married actresses Joyce Bulifant, Melody Patterson, and Helen Beth "H.B." Duntz. Hayes guest-starred on Hawaii Five-O in the 1975 episode "Retire in Sunny Hawaii... Forever". She and her son appeared in The Love Boat episode "No Girls for Doc/Marriage of Convenience/The Caller/The Witness".

Hayes was hospitalized a number of times for asthma, which was aggravated by stage dust, forcing her to retire from theater in 1971, at age 71.

Her last Broadway show was a 1970 revival of Harvey, in which she co-starred with James Stewart. Clive Barnes wrote, "She epitomizes flustered charm almost as if it were a style of acting ... She is one of those actors ... where to watch how she is doing something is almost as pleasurable as what she is doing." She spent most of her last years writing and raising money for organizations that fight asthma.

Philanthropy 

Hayes was a generous donor of time and money to a number of causes and organizations, including the Riverside Shakespeare Company of New York City. Along with Mildred Natwick, she became a founding member of the company's Board of Advisors in 1981. She was also on the board of directors for the Greater New York Council of the Girl Scouts of the USA during the early 1970s.

In 1982, Hayes dedicated Riverside's The Shakespeare Center with New York theatre producer, Joseph Papp, and in 1985 she returned to the New York stage in a benefit for the company with a reading of A Christmas Carol with Raul Julia, Len Cariou, Mary Elizabeth Mastrantonio, Carole Shelley, Celeste Holm and Harold Scott, directed by W. Stuart McDowell. The next year Hayes performed a second benefit for the Riverside Shakespeare Company, this time at the Marquis Theatre, the construction of which had been made possible by the demolition of the Helen Hayes Theatre three years before. The production featured Rex Smith, Ossie Davis and F. Murray Abraham, and was produced by McDowell and directed by Robert Small, with Hayes narrating.

Helen Hayes Hospital 

According to her daughter-in-law, HB MacArthur, Hayes took the most pride in her philanthropic work with Helen Hayes Hospital, a physical rehabilitation hospital located in West Haverstraw, New York. She was extremely proud of the strides the hospital made toward the rehabilitation of people with disabilities, saying: "I've seen my name in lights on theater marquees and in letters 20 feet tall on Broadway billboards, but nothing has ever given me greater sense of pride and satisfaction than my 49-year association with this unique hospital."

Hayes became involved with the hospital in the 1940s and was named to the Board of Visitors in 1944. In 1974, the hospital was renamed in her honor. She served on the Helen Hayes Hospital Board of Visitors for 49 years, until her death in 1993. In that time, she advocated tirelessly for the hospital and successfully led a fight to prevent its relocation to Albany in the 1960s. In the 1970s, she was instrumental in lobbying for funding to transform the hospital into a state-of-the-art facility.

Hayes also contributed her enthusiastic support to hospital events and fund-raising efforts, including handing out diplomas to the children upon graduation when the hospital was still a pediatric care facility. She also faithfully attended the hospital's annual Classic Race, leading it in a classic car, handing out awards to runners, hand cyclists, and wheelchair racers, and offering the use of her home, Pretty Penny, for a dinner to launch the hospital's endowment fund.

Death 
Hayes died on March 17, 1993, of congestive heart failure in Nyack, New York. Hayes's friend Lillian Gish, the "First Lady of American Cinema", was the designated beneficiary of her estate, but Gish had died less than a month earlier. Hayes was interred in Oak Hill Cemetery in Nyack and was survived by her son, James Gordon MacArthur, and four grandchildren: Charles P. MacArthur, Mary McClure, Juliette Rappaport, and James D. MacArthur. In 2011, she was honored with a US postage stamp.

Acting credits

Theatre

Film

Television 
{| class="wikitable"
|- style="text-align:center;"
! style="background:#B0C4DE;" | Year
! style="background:#B0C4DE;" | Title
! style="background:#B0C4DE;" | Role
! style="background:#B0C4DE;" | Notes
|-
|rowspan=3|1950
|-
|Prudential Family Playhouse
|Elizabeth Moulton-Barrett
|The Barretts of Wimpole Street
|-
| rowspan="2" |Pulitzer Prize Playhouse
|Gwenny Bean
|The Late Christopher Bean
|-
|rowspan=5|1951
|Mary Stuart, Queen of Scots
|Mary of Scotland
|-
| rowspan="3" |Schlitz Playhouse of Stars
| Honora Canderay
|Dark Fleece
|-
|
|The Lucky Touch
|-
|
|Not a Chance
|-
|Robert Montgomery Presents
|Queen Victoria
|Victoria Regina
|-
|1952
| rowspan="3" |Omnibus
|
|The Twelve Pound Look
|-
|rowspan=3|1953
|Mrs. Kirby
|The Happy Journey
|-
|Mom
|Mom and Leo
|-
|Medallion Theatre
|Harriet Beecher Stowe
|"Battle Hymn"
|-
|rowspan=3|1954
|The United States Steel Hour
|Mrs. Austin
|Welcome Home
|-
|The Best of Broadway
|Fanny Cavendish
|The Royal Family
|-
|The Motorola Television Hour
|Frances Parry
|Side by Side
|-
|rowspan=2|1955
|Producers' Showcase
|Margaret Antrobus
|The Skin of Our Teeth
|-
|The Best of Broadway
|Abby Brewster
|Arsenic and Old Lace
|-
|rowspan=2|1956
| rowspan="2" |Omnibus
|Mrs. Dearth
|Dear Brutus
|-
|Bessie Arlington
|Episode: "The Christmas Tie"
|-
|rowspan=2|1957
|The Alcoa Hour
|Mrs. Gilling
|Episode: "Mrs. Gilling and the Skyscraper"
|-
|Playhouse 90
|Sister Theresa
|Four Women in Black
|-
|rowspan=2|1958
|Omnibus
|Mrs. Howard V. Larue III
|Episode: "Mrs. McThing"
|-
|The United States Steel Hour
|Mother Seraphim
|Episode: "One Red Rose for Christmas"
|-
|rowspan=2|1959
|Hallmark Hall of Fame
|Essie Miller
|Ah, Wilderness!
|-
|Play of the Week
|Madame Ranevskaya
|The Cherry Orchard
|-
|rowspan=3|1960
|The Bell Telephone Hour
|Baroness Nadedja von Meck
|The Music of Romance
|-
|Play of the Week
|Mother Hildebrand
|The Velvet Glove
|-
|Dow Hour of Great Mysteries
|Letitia Van Gorder
|The Bat by Mary Roberts Rinehart and Avery Hopwood
|-
|1963
|The Christophers
|
|What One Bootmaker Did
|-
|1967
|Tarzan
|Mrs. Wilson
|The Pride of the Lioness
|-
|1969
|Arsenic and Old Lace
|Abby Brewster
|TV movie
|-
|1970
|The Front Page
|Narrator (voice)
|TV movie
|-
|1971
|Do Not Fold, Spindle or Mutilate
|Sophie Tate Curtis
|TV movie
|-
|rowspan=3|1972
|Harvey
|Veta Louise Simmons
|TV movie
|-
|Here's Lucy
|Mrs. Kathleen Brady
|Episode: "Lucy and the Little Old Lady"
|-
|Ghost Story
|Miss Gilden
|Episode: "Alter-Ego"
|-
|1973–1974
|The Snoop Sisters
|Ernesta Snoop
|TV series (5 episodes)
|-
|1975
|Hawaii Five-O
|Clara Williams
|Episode: "Retire in Sunny Hawaii... Forever"
|-
|rowspan=2|1976
|The Moneychangers
|Dr. McCartney
|TV miniseries
|-
|Victory at Entebbe
|Etta Grossman-Wise
|TV movie
|-
|1978
|A Family Upside Down
|Emma Long
|TV movie
|-
|1980
|The Love Boat
|Agatha Winslow
|Episode: No Girls for Doc/Marriage of Convenience/The Caller/The Witness"
|-
|rowspan=2|1982
|Love, Sidney
|Mrs. Clovis
|Episode: "Pro and Cons"
|-
|Murder Is Easy
|Lavinia Fullerton
|TV movie
|-
|1983
|A Caribbean Mystery
|Miss Jane Marple
|TV movie
|-
|1984
|Highway to Heaven
|Estelle Wicks
|Episode: Highway to Heaven: Part 1 & 2" 
|-
|1985
|Murder with Mirrors|Miss Jane Marple
|TV movie
|}

 Awards and honors 

In 1972, she received the Golden Plate Award of the American Academy of Achievement. The following year, in 1973, Hayes was inducted into the National Women's Hall of Fame. In 1979, the Supersisters trading card set was produced and distributed; one of the cards featured Hayes's name and picture. In 1983, Hayes received the Award for Greatest Public Service Benefiting the Disadvantaged, an award given out annually by Jefferson Awards. In 1979, she received the Laetare Medal from the University of Notre Dame.

 See also 
 List of persons who have won Academy, Emmy, Grammy, and Tony Awards
 List of actors with Academy Award nominations
List of people from Morelos, Mexico

 References 

 Bibliography 
Mosel, Tad and Macy, Gertrude. Leading Lady:  The World and Theatre of Katharine Cornell(1978), Little, Brown & Co, Boston, 
Murphy, Donn B. and Moore, Stephen. Helen Hayes; A Bio-Bibliography (1993)
Kennedy, Harold J. No Pickle, No Performance. An Irreverent Theatrical Excursion from Tallulah to Travolta'', Doubleday & Co. (1978)

External links 

 
 
 
 Official site
 Tribute site
 Helen Hayes papers, 1817–1963 (bulk dates 1905–1963), held by the Billy Rose Theatre Division, New York Public Library for the Performing Arts
 American Masters (PBS)
 The Helen Hayes Awards
 Photographs of Helen Hayes
Lifetime Honors – National Medal of Arts
Helen Hayes Hospital
Helen Hayes Hospital Foundation

1900 births
1993 deaths
20th-century American actresses
Actresses from Washington, D.C.
American film actresses
American people of Irish descent
American Roman Catholics
American stage actresses
Best Actress Academy Award winners
Best Supporting Actress Academy Award winners
California Republicans
Grammy Award winners
Kennedy Center honorees
Laetare Medal recipients
Outstanding Performance by a Lead Actress in a Drama Series Primetime Emmy Award winners
People from Cuernavaca
People from Morelos
People from Nyack, New York
Presidential Medal of Freedom recipients
Special Tony Award recipients
Tony Award winners
United States National Medal of Arts recipients
Vaudeville performers
Volpi Cup for Best Actress winners
Conservatism in the United States